The Women's Giant Slalom in the 2021 FIS Alpine Skiing World Cup consisted of 8 events including the final in Lenzerheide, Switzerland. The original schedule had included nine events, but a race in Semmering had to be cancelled after the first run had already been completed when hurricane-force winds moved in and caused significant damage, including to the timing equipment.

Italian skier Marta Bassino won four of the first five events in the discipline to establish a lead of over 100 points, which remained consistent from there; she clinched the crystal globe for the season after the next-to-last event in Jasná, Slovakia, where she finished fourth.

The season was interrupted by the 2021 World Ski Championships, which were held from 8–21 February in Cortina d'Ampezzo, Italy.  The women's giant slalom took place on 18 February 2021.

The final took place on Sunday, 21 March in Lenzerheide, Switzerland. Only the top 25 of the specific ranking and the winner of the Junior World Championship, plus athletes who have scored at least 500 points in the overall classification, were eligible.

Standings

DNS = Did Not Start
DNF1 = Did Not Finish run 1
DNQ = Did Not Qualify for run 2
DNF = Did Not Finish run 2

See also
 2021 Alpine Skiing World Cup – Women's summary rankings
 2021 Alpine Skiing World Cup – Women's Overall
 2021 Alpine Skiing World Cup – Women's Downhill
 2021 Alpine Skiing World Cup – Women's Super-G
 2021 Alpine Skiing World Cup – Women's Slalom
 2021 Alpine Skiing World Cup – Women's Parallel
 World Cup scoring system

References

External links
 Alpine Skiing at FIS website

Women's Giant Slalom
FIS Alpine Ski World Cup women's giant slalom discipline titles